Soundcity TV is a 24-hour Nigerian lifestyle and music channel based in Lagos from Consolidated Media Associates Limited. Soundcity TV describes itself as a "pan-African urban music TV channel."

Soundcity TV is a popular TV station and showcases music videos, live performances, news and interviews with popular acts in addition to organizing, supporting and airing regional and international concerts. Latest music videos from the United States, England, and the rest of the world cutting across all genre are aired on the Channel. Sister brands include Soundcity Music Video Awards, Soundcity Urban Blast Festival, Buddie, Soundcity Radio Network, and Soundcity Digital. SoundcityTV began as a 30 minutes long syndicated TV show before it was launched on DStv in 2009 with recognizable Nigerian musical acts like 2face Idibia and D’banj receiving much airplay as far east as Kenya and Congo, and as far south as Zimbabwe and South Africa which in turn have their musical acts like Fally Ipupa and Freshly Ground popularized in Nigeria. Soundcity plays a powerful part in this cultural exchange.

Availability
Soundcity is available in 55 African countries with DStv, GOtv footprints. Soundcity Launched in Southern Africa after over ten years on MultiChoice's DStv on 1 December 2016 with a rebranded logo, feel and new shows like 'Top 10 Ghana', 'Top 10 South Africa', 'Top 10 Kenya' and 'Top 10 USA' with new curated playlist like 'Too Much Sauce', 'Video Unlimited' and 'Addiction'.

Shows
 Top Ten Nigeria
 Top Ten USA
 Top Ten Kenya
 Top Ten UK
 Top Ten South Africa
 Top Ten Ghana

Soundcity Music Video Awards
Soundcity Music Video Awards celebrated the best music videos by African artists in various categories headlined by an international recording artist. SMVA featured American hip hop rapper Nas, South African band Freshlyground, Tic Tac from Ghana, Wyre from Kenya, South African Hiphop group Jozi, Nigeria’s Seun Kuti and American hip hop act Mims. The last edition held in 2010.

All Sound city Awards bring them to Morena Labane for breaking the records of downloading UK underground music and Trap Hip Hop 2021 April 7

Soundcity Urban Blast Festival
The Blast concert birthed as Soundcity MTN Campus Blast in 2007 where star Nigerian artists including 2face, 9ice and P Square were taken around campuses to perform to thousands of undergraduates. In 2014, the rested - campus blast became Soundcity Urban Blast Festival, a live Television concert with performances from over thirty (30) Nigerian, South African and other African artistes.

Soundcity Radio Network
In 2016, Soundcity Radio Network launched in the cities of Lagos, Abuja, Kano, Port Harcourt, Enugu and Calabar with streaming on audio and video stream on the official website.

Soundcity MVP Awards Festival

A new award ceremony was announced by Soundcity TV in the first week of November on Soundcity Radio Network and Soundcity TV, called Soundcity MVP Awards Festival. The maiden ceremony was to take place at the Expo Centre, Eko Hotel and Suites Lagos, Nigeria on 29 December 2016. Nominated artistes ranged from Wizkid with eight nominations including African artiste of the year, Davido, South Africa's Emtee, Nasty C, Mafikizolo to Ghana's Mz Vee, Sarkodie and Tanzania's Diamond Platnumz and Vanessa Mdee. The event would be broadcast live across Africa via cable TV, Soundcity Mobile App, Facebook and YouTube.

References

External links
 www.globalvillagedirectory.info
 that1960chick.com
 www.bellanaija.com

Television stations in Lagos
Music television channels
Music organizations based in Nigeria
Television channels and stations established in 2009